Claire Field is an Australian artist and curator.

She is co-founder of the collaborative project Favour Economy, with Bronwyn Treacy and Alexandra Pedley. Favour Economy is a digital platform for women artists and industry peers to share their experiences with others through an audio "favour". The project began in 2015, and the audio recordings are published annually as a podcast. Favour Economy is currently co-led by Claire Field, Stella Chen and MX Tonié Field.

Favour Economy was a participant in the Doing Feminism; Sharing the World residency program (curated by Anne Marsh and Caroline Phillips), and the Aesthetics, Politics and Histories: The Social Context of Art 2018 AAANZ Conference at RMIT School of Art. Volume 1 (2015–2016) and Volume 2 (2016–2017) of the Favour Economy archives were installed as a participatory installation at George Paton Gallery, Melbourne and AIRspace Projects, Sydney (2017), with Volumes 1, 2 and 3 exhibited at Museum of Contemporary Art Australia ARTBAR Things We Do Together curated by Lara Merrett in Sydney 2019.

Field co-curated, with Tian Zhang, the exhibition Site of Passage, at Customs House, NSW, in 2019. The exhibition included the work of 9 contemporary Australian artists; Atong Atem, Cigdem Aydemir, Anindita Banerjee, Liam Benson, Vonda Keji, Nikki Lam, Nicole Monks, Raquel Ormella and Christian Thompson who each investigate aspects of who they are in their work and through this process claim parts of themselves that may have been complicated or obscured by colonisation, displacement or migration. Site of Passage referenced the history of the Customs House as a place of cross-cultural interaction as the point of immigration into Sydney for over 140 years and acknowledges that Warrane (Circular Quay) was the site of first contact between the Gadigal and the British, a moment in time that led to the invasion of Aboriginal land and the dispossession of Aboriginal people and their cultures.

In Field's practice as a visual artist, she exhibited work as part of the RMIT University VVitchVVaVVe Post Digital Aesthetics Symposium(2018 curated by Nancy Mauro-Flude and Tom Penney) and has held two solo exhibitions at Salamanca Arts Centre, Hobart: 2002 Kelly's Garden, curated by Arjan Kok, and 2005 Cluster Obscurer.

References 

Australian curators
University of Tasmania alumni
University of Sydney alumni
21st-century Australian women artists
Living people
Year of birth missing (living people)
Australian women curators